Clocking Off is a British television drama series which was broadcast on BBC One for four series from 2000 to 2003. It was produced for the BBC by the independent Red Production Company, and created by Paul Abbott.

It was effectively an anthology programme, following the lives of a group of workers at a Manchester textile factory, with each episode focusing on the home life of a different character. Well-known actors and actresses who appeared in the series included Christopher Eccleston, Sophie Okonedo, Philip Glenister, John Simm, Lesley Sharp, Siobhan Finneran, Emma Cunniffe, Diane Parish, David Morrissey, Ricky Tomlinson, Julian Rhind-Tutt, William Ash, Ben Crompton, Jack Deam, Jack P. Shepherd, Tina O'Brien, Jason Merrells, Pam Ferris, Wil Johnson, Ashley Jensen, Susan Cookson, Mark Benton, Lindsey Coulson, Paul Copley, Sarah Lancashire, Crissy Rock, Marshall Lancaster, Marc Warren, Claire Sweeney and Maxine Peake.

The series was highly acclaimed by the critics, winning the British Academy Television Award for Best Drama Series in 2001. However, over the course of the following two years Abbott's work on the series decreased as he moved on to other projects. Nonetheless, every series was nominated for a BAFTA and other writers including Danny Brocklehurst, John Fay and Jan McVerry wrote successful stand-alone episodes. The programme finally ended, after a series with no Abbott scripts at all, in 2003. The BBC said the programme was axed following declining ratings, but creator Abbott said the programme's demise was down to "a lack of writers able to come up with stories good enough to carry the stand alone episodes."

Twenty-seven episodes were produced across the four series, and in 2004 the first series was released on DVD. In 2015, the first series was released on DVD in Australia and was made available for purchase via the BBC Store.

Cast

Episodes

Series 1 (2000)

Series 2 (2001)

Series 3 (2002)

Series 4 (2003)

References

External links
 
Clocking Off at bbc.co.uk
Clocking Off at the British Film Institute

2000 British television series debuts
2003 British television series endings
2000s British drama television series
BBC television dramas
English-language television shows
Television shows set in Manchester
Television series by Red Production Company